Darshan Gurjar is an Indian film and TV actor working in Bollywood films and Indian TV Serials. He has worked in more than 5 films, 17 TV serials and around 10 commercial films.

Film career
Darshan started his films career in 2012 with Gunday, a film under the banner of Yash Raj Films. He played the young character of Ranveer Singh, Bikram. After that, got chances to work in several films such as Ishq Junoon, Tennis Buddies, Paper Boats, etc.

Television career
Darshan mainly worked in India Television daily soaps. He came into the limelight with the Colors TV show Udaan, as Suraj. He also worked in shows such as Devon Ke Dev...Mahadev as Kartikeya and Jamuna Paar as Chotte. Also appeared several time in episodic shows such as Gumrah, CID, Crimepetrol, Savdhaan India, Fear Files, Code Red, etc.

Filmography

Television

Films 

Recently in 2022  released web series called Dahan: Rakaan ka Rahasya on Disney+Hotstar he worked as character named Dinesh
Also, acted in latest Hindi movie, 'Silence... Can You Hear It?' a 2021 Indian Hindi-language thriller film, one of the young boys trekking at the start of the movie, who discovers the dead body of a girl.

References

External links
 

Indian male film actors
21st-century Indian male child actors
Living people
Male actors in Hindi cinema
Year of birth missing (living people)